Michael Calfan (born 12 November 1990) is a French DJ and house music producer.

Biography
Calfan was born in 1990 in Paris, France. In 2008, he was discovered by Bob Sinclar who was also noted as one of the most promising artists of his label Yellow Productions.

In late 2011, the single "Resurrection" was released through Axwell's record label Axtone Records.

In 2014, he released the single "Prelude" through Spinnin' Records (which entered the Billboard Dance/Mix Show Airplay) and "Treasured Soul", which reached number 17 in the singles chart in the United Kingdom in April 2015.

Discography

Charting and certified singles

Singles

Bonuses: Michael Calfan & IMAN - Blinded By The Lights, Michael Calfan - Eighteen (2022)

Remixes

2019
 Calvin Harris and Rag'n'Bone Man — "Giant" (Michael Calfan Remix)
 Glowie — "Cruel" (Michael Calfan Remix)
 Not3s — "Wanting" (Michael Calfan Remix)
 Labrinth — "Miracle" (Michael Calfan Remix)
 Kiiara — "Open My Mouth" (Michael Calfan Remix)
 Hayden James — "Nowhere to Go" (Michael Calfan Remix)

2020
 Iamnotshane — "Afterlife" (Michael Calfan Remix)
 Michael Calfan and Martin Solveig — "No Lie" (Michael Calfan Remix)
 Illenium — "Nightlight" (Michael Calfan Remix)
 Sigala and James Arthur — "Lasting Lover" (Michael Calfan Remix)

2021
 Cheat Codes and Tinashe — "Lean on Me" (Michael Calfan Remix)
 Jason Derulo - "Acapulco" (Michael Calfan Remix)

References

Notes
 A  "Thorns" did not enter the Ultratop 50, but peaked at number 49 on the Ultratip Dance chart.

Sources

External links
 

French DJs
French house musicians
Living people
1990 births
Spinnin' Records artists
Electronic dance music DJs